The state auditor of South Dakota is a constitutional officer in the executive branch of the U.S. state of South Dakota. Twenty-seven individuals have held the office of state auditor since statehood. The incumbent is Rich Sattgast, a Republican.

Powers and duties
The state auditor is the elected watchdog of state government, scrutinizing and approving the disbursement of public funds paid out of the state treasury. The state auditor exercises this constitutional authority by preauditing all claims and vouchers against the state, issuing warrants on the state treasurer, reconciling fund balances, and submitting reports on the state's financial condition to the governor, legislature, and various state agencies.

The state auditor also administers payroll for state employees. This function entails collecting payroll and withheld federal income taxes from state employees, coordinating deposits with the IRS and  Social Security Administration, filing W-2s for state employees, and auditing payroll data maintained by state agencies and over 700 political subdivisions, including counties, cities, school districts, townships, and water districts.

In South Dakota, the state auditor does not postaudit state agencies or local governments. Financial, compliance, and performance audits of state agencies and local governments are instead the responsibility of the Department of Legislative Audit, which is led by an auditor general appointed by the legislature. Likewise, the state auditor does not maintain the state accounting system, design and enforce internal controls, or prepare the state's financial statements. Rather, these functions rest with the Bureau of Finance and Management, a division of the Department of Executive Management that also prepares and manages the state budget. Both the bureau and department are subject to the governor's direction and supervision.

References

 
South Dakota